Masticatory force or force of mastication is the force created by the dynamic action of the masticatory muscles during the act of chewing.

Masticatory muscles

The muscles that power the jaw movements during chewing are known as the muscles of mastication or masticatory muscles, and are functionally classified as:

 Jaw elevators: the masseter, temporalis, medial pterygoid and superior belly of the lateral pterygoid
 Jaw depressors; the anterior digastrics, geniohyoid, mylohyoid and inferior belly of the lateral pterygoid

Measuring masticatory force

The first device for measuring masticatory force (gnathodynamometer) was created by Black in 1893. He determined that periodontal tissue is an important issue, which impacts the amount of force. Morill found out that masticatory muscles stop their contraction differently upon the appearance of pain signals from the periodontal tissue.

Shreder used local anaesthesia to ignore the periodontal response to measure the maximum force of mastication.

Weber worked out that 1 cm2 surface of perpendicular slide of any masticatory muscle can produce approximately  force. The following surfaces were found

 temporalis – 8 cm2
 masseter – 7.5 cm2
 medial pterygoid – 4 cm2

Forces 

Nankali studied chewing in multiple individuals. He found variation in the amount of masticatory force.

The masticatory forces changes at eating time according to mouthful characteristic and size. This has various effects on the maxilla and mandible via the teeth. The periodontal system automatically controls the measure of mastication force. The jaw elevator muscles develop the main forces used in mastication. 

The study of masticatory force in patients with polymyositis and dermatomyositis shows that hyposalivation and mucosal alterations can be related to the pathology of masticatory system.

Force distribution 

Nankali systematized masticatory force distribution. According to this system, force is divided in two main groups, with physiological or pathological conditions. The physiological masticatory force is divided into three subgroups according to their localizations: anterior, general (covering the entire arch) and posterior part of arch, which is also  divided into two different groups; unilateral and bilateral.

Producing a maximum masticatory force uses the general subgroup of this systematization.

References

Further reading 

 

Restorative dentistry
Dentistry
Prosthodontology